Renato Rosaldo (born 1941) is an American cultural anthropologist. He has done field research among the Ilongots of northern Luzon, Philippines, and he is the author of Ilongot Headhunting: 1883–1974: A Study in Society and History (1980) and Culture and Truth: The Remaking of Social Analysis (1989).

He is also the editor of Creativity/Anthropology (with Smadar Lavie and Kirin Narayan) (1993), Anthropology of Globalization (with Jon Inda) (2001), and Cultural Citizenship in Island Southeast Asia: National and Belonging in the Hinterlands (2003), among other books.

Rosaldo conducted research on cultural citizenship in San Jose, California from 1989–1998, and he contributed the introduction and an article to Latino Cultural Citizenship: Claiming Identity, Space, and Rights (1997). He is also a poet and has published four volumes of poetry, most recently The Chasers (2019).

Rosaldo has served as president of the American Ethnological Society, director of the Stanford Center for Chicano Research, and chair of the Stanford Department of Anthropology. He now teaches at NYU, where he served as the inaugural Director of Latino Studies.

Life
Renato Rosaldo was born on April 15, 1941 in Champaign, Illinois, US. At a young age, Rosaldo spoke Spanish with his Mexican father and English with his Anglo mother. When he was four, his family moved to Madison, Wisconsin, where his father taught Mexican and Latin American literature at the University of Wisconsin. When he was twelve, they moved to Tucson, Arizona, where his father taught in  the Spanish department at the University of Arizona. Rosaldo attended Tucson High School, where he became a member of a "social club" called The Chasers, about which he later wrote an eponymous book of poetry. Living in different cultural settings during his formative years, Rosaldo had to learn and relearn el trato, the interactional social contract underlying participation in social life, "how to treat other guys and girls".

Rosaldo entered Harvard University in 1959, taking classes in  anthropology, Spanish history and literature. His teachers included Beatrice Whiting and Laura Nader.
Rosaldo graduated from Harvard College with an A.B. in Spanish History and Literature in 1963. He spent a year, 1963–1964, in Spain but saw no future for Spanish scholarship under Francisco Franco.  Returning to Harvard, Rosaldo studied  Social Anthropology, receiving his Ph.D. in 1971 for his work in the Philippines on Ilongot social organization.

Rosaldo joined the  Stanford University anthropology faculty in 1970. He became the Lucie Stern Professor in the Social Sciences (emeritus).

In 2003, Rosaldo left Stanford to teach at New York University. He is a New York Institute for the Humanities Fellow.

Rosaldo's published anthropological works include:  Ilongot Headhunting, 1883–1974: A Study in Society and History (1980);  Culture and Truth: The Remaking of Social Analysis  (1989);  The Inca and Aztec States, 1400–1800: Anthropology and History co-edited, (1982); Anthropology/Creativity (1993); and The Anthropology of Globalization (2001)

He has also published four volumes of poetry.  The first, Prayer to Spider Woman/Rezo a la mujer araña (Rosaldo 2003) in Spanish and English, won an American Book Award of the Before Columbus Foundation. The second, Diego Luna’s Insider Tips (2012) won the Many Mountains Moving book manuscript contest for 2009.  The Day of Shelly’s Death appeared in 2014, and The Chasers in 2019.
Rosaldo's poetry has also appeared in Bilingual Review, Many Mountains Moving, Prairie Schooner, Puerto del Sol, Texas Observer. He has coined the term antropoeta to describe his movement between anthropology and poetry.

He was married to anthropologist Michelle Zimbalist Rosaldo (1944–1981). He is currently married to Mary Louise Pratt, a scholar of Latin American Studies and Comparative Literature. He has three children (Sam, Manuel, and Olivia), and three grandchildren.

Awards
 1997 elected member of the American Academy of Arts and Sciences
 2004 American Book Award

Works
Poetry
 
 
 
 

Anthropology
 
 
 
 "Of Headhunters and Soldiers: Separating Cultural and Ethical Relativism", Issues in Ethics, Vol. 11, N. 1, Winter 2000, The Markkula Center for Applied Ethics
 
 Juan Flores, Renato Rosaldo, eds. (2007). A Companion to Latina/o Studies'', Blackwell Publishing. .
 John Xavier Inda, Renato Rosaldo, eds. (2008).

Chapters

References

External links
 Renato Rosaldo Papers housed at Stanford Libraries
 "Conversation Transcript", How I Write
 "Interview with Renato Rosaldo", Hemispheric Institute July 2002
 "Juan Felipe Herrera on The Day of Shelly's Death : The Poetry and Ethnography of Grief", LA Review of Books, March 7, 2014
 https://www.npr.org/sections/health-shots/2017/06/01/529876861/an-anthropologist-discovers-the-terrible-emotion-locked-in-a-word
 Early Chicano/Latino History at Stanford: A Faculty Perspective, Stanford Historical Society Oral History Program, 2019

1941 births
Living people
Cultural anthropologists
Postmodernists
Headhunting accounts and studies
Stanford University Department of Anthropology faculty
New York University faculty
American anthropologists
Harvard College alumni
American Book Award winners
Tucson High School alumni